Lucy S. Furman (June 7, 1870 – August 24, 1958) was an American novelist, short story writer, and animal rights activist. Her fiction was a foundational influence on what would become Appalachian literature.

Biography
Lucy Furman was born in Henderson County, Kentucky on June 7, 1869. After her parents’ death early in her life, she moved to Evansville, Indiana. She eventually returned to Kentucky to attend Sayre School in Lexington, graduating in 1885. Upon her graduation, she moved to Shreveport, Louisiana, before moving back to Evansville, where she would live and work independently. In 1894, Century Magazine published some of Furman's short stories. The magazine began to serialize these stories, which were based on her observations of Henderson. Then in 1896, Century collected the short stories into a book titled, Stories of a Sanctified Town.

After this publication, Furman moved to Hindman Settlement School, where she became the school's first director of grounds, gardens, and livestock. During her twenty years' service there, she fictionalized her observations into stories that were published by The Atlantic and Century Magazine, then later collected in best-selling novels such as Mothering on Perilous (1913), Sight to the Blind (1914), The Quare Women (1923), The Glass Window (1924), and The Lonesome Road (1927). For her work as a southern female writer, Furman earned the George Fort Milton Award in 1932.

While known for her writing, Furman was also a leader in the Anti-Steel Trap League of Washington, DC, writing, publishing, and lecturing widely on the subject. In 1934, Furman proposed an anti-steel trap bill to Kentucky's General Assembly. The bill passed and took effect in 1940. In 1953, she retired and moved to Cranford, New Jersey, where she lived with her nephew. She died there on August 25, 1958.

Bibliography

 Stories of a Sanctified Town (1896)
 Mothering on Perilous (1913)
 Sight to the Blind (1914)
 The Quare Women (1923)
 The Glass Window (1925)
 The Lonesome Road (1927)

References

External links
 
 

19th-century American writers
20th-century American writers
20th-century American women writers
1870 births
1958 deaths
People from Henderson, Kentucky
19th-century American women writers
Writers from Kentucky
Kentucky women writers